Progress 33 was a Soviet uncrewed Progress cargo spacecraft, which was launched in November 1987 to resupply the Mir space station.

Launch
Progress 33 launched on 20 November 1987 from the Baikonur Cosmodrome in the Kazakh SSR. It used a Soyuz-U2 rocket.

Docking
Progress 33 docked with the aft port of the Kvant-1 module of Mir on 23 November 1987 at 01:39:13 UTC, and was undocked on 19 December 1987 at 08:15:46 UTC.

Decay
It remained in orbit until 19 December 1987, when it was deorbited. The deorbit burn occurred at 12:56:00 UTC and the mission ended at 13:37 UTC.

See also

 1987 in spaceflight
 List of Progress missions
 List of uncrewed spaceflights to Mir

References

Progress (spacecraft) missions
1987 in the Soviet Union
Spacecraft launched in 1987
Spacecraft which reentered in 1987
Spacecraft launched by Soyuz-U rockets